Marakka Mudiyuma? is a 1966 Indian Tamil-language drama film produced and directed by Murasoli Maran, and written by his uncle M. Karunanidhi. A remake of the Telugu film Santhanam (1955), it stars S. S. Rajendran, Devika, R. Muthuraman and Kanchana, with Cho, S. V. Sahasranamam Major Sundarrajan and S. A. Natarajan in supporting roles. The film was released on 12 August 1966.

Plot

Cast 
 S. S. Rajendran
 Devika
 R. Muthuraman
 Kanchana
 Cho
 S. V. Sahasranamam
 Major Sundarrajan
 K. Sarangapani
 S. A. Natarajan
A. Karunanidhi
 S. N. Lakshmi
 Master Prabhakar
T. K. S. Natarajan
 Master Sridhar
 Baby Kanchana
 Thirupathisamy
 Vijayarani
 Suryakala

Production 
Marakka Mudiyuma? is a remake of the Telugu film Santhanam (1955). It was the only film where Devika acted under M. Karunanidhi's writing. The film was produced and directed by Karunanidhi's nephew Murasoli Maran.

Soundtrack 
Music was by T. K. Ramamoorthy and lyrics were written by Karunanidhi, Suratha, Mayavanathan and Tiruchi Thyagarajan.

Reception 
Kalki appreciated the film for its cinematography, and Karunanidhi's story/dialogues.

References

External links 
 

1960s Tamil-language films
1966 drama films
1966 films
Filicide in fiction
Films about dysfunctional families
Films about poverty in India
Films about siblings
Films about women in India
Films with screenplays by M. Karunanidhi
Indian drama films
Indian nonlinear narrative films
Tamil remakes of Telugu films